Resket-e Olya (also Romanized as Resket-e ‘Olyā; also known as Bālā Raskat, Bālā Resket, and Resket) is a village in Farim Rural District, Dodangeh District, Sari County, Mazandaran Province, Iran. At the 2006 census, its population was 206, in 67 families.

References 

Populated places in Sari County